Chad Robert Bentz (born May 5, 1980) is an American former professional baseball pitcher who played in Major League Baseball. Bentz grew up in Juneau, and he made history on April 7, 2004, by becoming the second pitcher, after Jim Abbott, to play in the Major Leagues after being born without one of his hands. Bentz fielded and caught with his glove the same way Abbott did when he played in the 1980s and early 1990s. Like Abbott, Bentz has a deformed right hand. As a freshman in college, Bentz met Abbott who became his mentor.

He played in 36 games for Montreal in 2004, winning none and losing three, with an ERA of 5.86. He played only four games for Florida in 2005, pitching only two innings, and allowing seven earned runs. His daughter Kyla Bentz was born in 2004.

In , Bentz was invited to spring training with the Colorado Rockies, but did not make the team. In , he pitched for the Bridgeport Bluefish of the independent Atlantic League before being released on July 2. He briefly pitched for the American Defenders of New Hampshire of the Canadian American Association of Professional Baseball, but was released June 12, 2009. 

In 2010, Bentz joined the football team at Castleton State College in Castleton, Vermont. His weight then up to 265 pounds, Bentz was a running back for the NCAA Division III program. He appeared in nine games that season, gaining 29 yards on 12 carries and scoring twice. Bentz did not return to the program for the 2011 season.

In 2013, Bentz was named pitching coach for the Castleton State baseball program.

References

External links

1980 births
Living people
Albuquerque Isotopes players
American Defenders of New Hampshire players
American disabled sportspeople
American expatriate baseball players in Canada
Baseball coaches from Alaska
Baseball players from Alaska
Brevard County Manatees players
Bridgeport Bluefish players
Carolina Mudcats players
Castleton Spartans baseball coaches
Castleton Spartans football players
Charlotte Knights players
Chattanooga Lookouts players
Baseball players with disabilities
Edmonton Trappers players
Florida Marlins players
Harrisburg Senators players
Long Beach State Dirtbags baseball players
Louisville Bats players
Major League Baseball pitchers
Montreal Expos players
Nashua Pride players
People from Juneau, Alaska
People from Seward, Alaska
Vermont Expos players
Anchorage Glacier Pilots players